Scrammy Bay is a natural bay on the coast of Labrador in the province of Newfoundland and Labrador, Canada. It is in the southeast reaches of St. Michaels Bay to the east of Pinsent's Arm.

References

Bays of Newfoundland and Labrador